SRW may refer to:

 Search/Retrieve Web Service
 Super Robot Wars, a video game series published by Banpresto